The Duchy of Pomerania-Demmin, also known as the Duchy of Demmin, and the Duchy of Dymin, was a feudal duchy in Western Pomerania within the Holy Roman Empire. Its capital was Demmin. It was ruled by the Griffin dynasty. It existed in the High Middle Ages era, between 1160 and 1264.

The state was formed in 1160, in the partition of the Duchy of Pomerania, with duke Casimir I, as its first ruler. After death of its last ruler, duke Wartislaw III, the state was united with Pomerania-Stettin, forming the Duchy of Pomerania.

List of rulers 
Casimir I (1160–1180)
Bogislaw II and Casimir II (1187–1202)
Casimir II (1202–1219/1220)
Wartislaw III (1219/1920–1264)

Citations

Notes

References

Bibliography 
 K. Kozłowski, J. Podralski, Gryfici. Książęta Pomorza Zachodniego, Szczecin, Krajowa Agencja Wydawnicza, 1985, ISBN 83-03-00530-8, OCLC 189424372.
 J. W. Szymański, Książęcy ród Gryfitów, Goleniów–Kielce 2006, ISBN 83-7273-224-8.
 U. Scheil, ''Barnim I. Herzog von Pommern, NDB, ADB Deutsche Biographie

Former countries in Europe
Former monarchies of Europe
Duchies of the Holy Roman Empire
Demmin
12th-century establishments in Europe
13th-century disestablishments in Europe
12th century in the Holy Roman Empire
13th century in the Holy Roman Empire
States and territories established in 1160
States and territories disestablished in 1264